Chorus of the Saints is the third full-length album by Australian Christian rock band Revive.

Track listing 
 "Chorus of the Saints" – 3:26
 "Can't Change Yesterday" – 3:21
 "You Know" (featuring Mac Powell of Third Day) – 3:41
 "Don't Look Anywhere Else" – 3:28
 "Power" – 3:43
 "Stay" – 3:37
 "Distant Memories" – 3:18
 "You're All I Need" – 3:30
 "Wonder Why" – 3:17
 "Sit With Me" – 3:53
 "Promise of Tomorrow" - 3:00
 "Welcome to Eternity" (available as a free download from website)

References 

2008 albums
Revive (band) albums